In computer science, Hirschberg's algorithm, named after its inventor, Dan Hirschberg, is a dynamic programming algorithm that finds the optimal sequence alignment between two strings. Optimality is measured with the Levenshtein distance, defined to be the sum of the costs of insertions, replacements, deletions, and null actions needed to change one string into the other. Hirschberg's algorithm is simply described as a more space-efficient version of the Needleman–Wunsch algorithm that uses divide and conquer. Hirschberg's algorithm is commonly used in computational biology to find maximal global alignments of DNA and protein sequences.

Algorithm information
Hirschberg's algorithm is a generally applicable algorithm for optimal sequence alignment. BLAST and FASTA are suboptimal heuristics.  If x and y are strings, where length(x) = n and length(y) = m, the Needleman–Wunsch algorithm finds an optimal alignment in O(nm) time, using O(nm) space.  Hirschberg's algorithm is a clever modification of the Needleman–Wunsch Algorithm, which still takes O(nm) time, but needs only O(min{n, m}) space and is much faster in practice.
One application of the algorithm is finding sequence alignments of DNA or protein sequences. It is also a space-efficient way to calculate the longest common subsequence between two sets of data such as with the common diff tool.

The Hirschberg algorithm can be derived from the Needleman–Wunsch algorithm by observing that:
 one can compute the optimal alignment score by only storing the current and previous row of the Needleman–Wunsch score matrix;

Algorithm description 

We define , which returns the last line of the Needleman–Wunsch score matrix :

 function NWScore(X, Y)
     Score(0, 0) = 0 // 2 * (length(Y) + 1) array
     for j = 1 to length(Y)
         Score(0, j) = Score(0, j - 1) + Ins(Yj)
     for i = 1 to length(X) // Init array
         Score(1, 0) = Score(0, 0) + Del(Xi)
         for j = 1 to length(Y)
             scoreSub = Score(0, j - 1) + Sub(Xi, Yj)
             scoreDel = Score(0, j) + Del(Xi)
             scoreIns = Score(1, j - 1) + Ins(Yj)
             Score(1, j) = max(scoreSub, scoreDel, scoreIns)
         end
         // Copy Score[1] to Score[0]
         Score(0, :) = Score(1, :)
     end
     for j = 0 to length(Y)
         LastLine(j) = Score(1, j)
     return LastLine

Note that at any point,  only requires the two most recent rows of the score matrix. Thus,  is implemented in  space.

The Hirschberg algorithm follows:

 function Hirschberg(X, Y)
     Z = ""
     W = ""
     if length(X) == 0
         for i = 1 to length(Y)
             Z = Z + '-'
             W = W + Yi
         end
     else if length(Y) == 0
         for i = 1 to length(X)
             Z = Z + Xi
             W = W + '-'
         end
     else if length(X) == 1 or length(Y) == 1
         (Z, W) = NeedlemanWunsch(X, Y)
     else
         xlen = length(X)
         xmid = length(X) / 2
         ylen = length(Y)
 
         ScoreL = NWScore(X1:xmid, Y)
         ScoreR = NWScore(rev(Xxmid+1:xlen), rev(Y))
         ymid = arg max ScoreL + rev(ScoreR)
 
         (Z,W) = Hirschberg(X1:xmid, y1:ymid) + Hirschberg(Xxmid+1:xlen, Yymid+1:ylen)
     end
     return (Z, W)

Example 

Let

The optimal alignment is given by

  W = AGTACGCA
  Z = --TATGC-

Indeed, this can be verified by backtracking its corresponding Needleman–Wunsch matrix:

          T   A   T   G   C
      0  -2  -4  -6  -8 -10
  A  -2  -1   0  -2  -4  -6
  G  -4  -3  -2  -1   0  -2
  T  -6  -2  -4   0  -2  -1
  A  -8  -4   0  -2  -1  -3
  C -10  -6  -2  -1  -3   1
  G -12  -8  -4  -3   1  -1
  C -14 -10  -6  -5  -1   3
  A -16 -12  -8  -7  -3   1

The call to  produces the following matrix:

         T   A   T   G   C
     0  -2  -4  -6  -8 -10
  A -2  -1   0  -2  -4  -6
  G -4  -3  -2  -1   0  -2
  T -6  -2  -4   0  -2  -1
  A -8  -4   0  -2  -1  -3

Likewise,  generates the following matrix:

        C   G   T   A   T
     0 -2  -4  -6  -8 -10
  A -2 -1  -3  -5  -4  -6
  C -4  0  -2  -4  -6  -5
  G -6 -2   2   0  -2  -4
  C -8 -4   0   1  -1  -3

Their last lines (after reversing the latter) and sum of those are respectively

  ScoreL      = [ -8 -4  0 -2 -1 -3 ]
  rev(ScoreR) = [ -3 -1  1  0 -4 -8 ]
  Sum         = [-11 -5  1 -2 -5 -11]

The maximum (shown in bold) appears at ymid = 2, producing the partition .

The entire Hirschberg recursion (which we omit for brevity) produces the following tree:

                (AGTACGCA,TATGC)
                /               \
         (AGTA,TA)             (CGCA,TGC)
          /     \              /        \
      (AG)   (TA,TA)      (CG,TG)     (CA,C)
               /   \        /   \       
            (T,T) (A,A)  (C,T) (G,G) 

The leaves of the tree contain the optimal alignment.

See also
 Longest common subsequence

References

Sequence alignment algorithms
Bioinformatics algorithms
Articles with example pseudocode
Dynamic programming